William George Hindley (b East Retford, Nottinghamshire, England 16 March 1853; d. Mount Eliza, Victoria, Australia 18 May 1936) was  Archdeacon of Melbourne  from 1902 until 1927.
 
In 1878 he responded to an appeal by James Moorhouse, Bishop of Melbourne for volunteers to work in the bush country of Victoria, Australia. He was ordained deacon  in 1880, and priest in 1882. Hindley served at Bairnsdale, Carlton, Kew and East Melbourne.

References

1853 births
English emigrants to colonial Australia
Archdeacons of Melbourne
1936 deaths
People from Nottinghamshire